In mathematics, physics and chemistry, a space group is the symmetry group of an object in space, usually in three dimensions. The elements of a space group (its symmetry operations) are the rigid transformations of an object that leave it unchanged. In three dimensions, space groups are classified into 219 distinct types, or 230 types if chiral copies are considered distinct. Space groups are discrete cocompact groups of isometries of an oriented Euclidean space in any number of dimensions. In dimensions other than 3, they are sometimes called Bieberbach groups.

In crystallography, space groups are also called the crystallographic or Fedorov groups, and represent a description of the symmetry of the crystal. A definitive source regarding 3-dimensional space groups is the International Tables for Crystallography .

History
Space groups in 2 dimensions are the 17 wallpaper groups which have been known for several centuries, though the proof that the list was complete was only given in 1891, after the much more difficult classification of space groups had largely been completed.

In 1879 the German mathematician Leonhard Sohncke listed the 65 space groups (called Sohncke groups) whose elements preserve the chirality. More accurately, he listed 66 groups, but both the Russian mathematician and crystallographer Evgraf Fedorov and the German mathematician Arthur Moritz Schoenflies noticed that two of them were really the same. The space groups in three dimensions were first enumerated in 1891 by Fedorov (whose list had two omissions (I3d and Fdd2) and one duplication (Fmm2)), and shortly afterwards in 1891 were independently enumerated by Schönflies (whose list had four omissions (I3d, Pc, Cc, ?) and one duplication (P21m)). The correct list of 230 space groups was found by 1892 during correspondence between Fedorov and Schönflies.  later enumerated the groups with a different method, but omitted four groups (Fdd2, I2d, P21d, and P21c) even though he already had the correct list of 230 groups from Fedorov and Schönflies; the common claim that Barlow was unaware of their work is incorrect.  describes the history of the discovery of the space groups in detail.

Elements
The space groups in three dimensions are made from combinations of the 32 crystallographic point groups with the 14 Bravais lattices, each of the latter belonging to one of 7 lattice systems. What this means is that the action of any element of a given space group can be expressed as the action of an element of the appropriate point group followed optionally by a translation. A space group is thus some combination of the translational symmetry of a unit cell (including lattice centering), the point group symmetry operations of reflection, rotation and improper rotation (also called rotoinversion), and the screw axis and glide plane symmetry operations. The combination of all these symmetry operations results in a total of 230 different space groups describing all possible crystal symmetries.

Elements fixing a point
The elements of the space group fixing a point of space are the identity element, reflections, rotations and improper rotations.

Translations
The translations form a normal abelian subgroup of rank 3, called the Bravais lattice (so named after French physicist Auguste Bravais). There are 14 possible types of Bravais lattice. The quotient of the space group by the Bravais lattice is a finite group which is one of the 32 possible point groups.

Glide planes
A glide plane is a reflection in a plane, followed by a translation parallel with that plane. There is also the  glide, which is a glide along the half of a diagonal of a face, and the  glide, which is a fourth of the way along either a face or space diagonal of the unit cell. The latter is called the diamond glide plane as it features in the diamond structure. In 17 space groups, due to the centering of the cell, the glides occur in two perpendicular directions simultaneously, i.e. the same glide plane can be called b or c, a or b, a or c. For example, group Abm2 could be also called Acm2, group Ccca could be called Cccb. In 1992, it was suggested to use symbol e for such planes. The symbols for five space groups have been modified:

Screw axes
A screw axis is a rotation about an axis, followed by a translation along the direction of the axis.  These are noted by a number, n, to describe the degree of rotation, where the number is how many operations must be applied to complete a full rotation (e.g., 3 would mean a rotation one third of the way around the axis each time).  The degree of translation is then added as a subscript showing how far along the axis the translation is, as a portion of the parallel lattice vector. So, 21 is a twofold rotation followed by a translation of 1/2 of the lattice vector.

General formula 
The general formula for the action of an element of a space group is

 y = M.x + D

where M is its matrix, D is its vector, and where the element transforms point x into point y. In general, D = D (lattice) + , where  is a unique function of M that is zero for M being the identity. The matrices M form a point group that is a basis of the space group; the lattice must be symmetric under that point group, but the crystal structure itself may not be symmetric under that point group as applied to any particular point (that is, without a translation). For example, the diamond cubic structure does not have any point where the cubic point group applies.

The lattice dimension can be less than the overall dimension, resulting in a "subperiodic" space group. For (overall dimension, lattice dimension):
 (1,1): One-dimensional line groups
 (2,1): Two-dimensional line groups: frieze groups
 (2,2): Wallpaper groups
 (3,1): Three-dimensional line groups; with the 3D crystallographic point groups, the rod groups
 (3,2): Layer groups
 (3,3): The space groups discussed in this article

Notation

There are at least ten methods of naming space groups.  Some of these methods can assign several different names to the same space group, so altogether there are many thousands of different names.

 Number The International Union of Crystallography publishes tables of all space group types, and assigns each a unique number from 1 to 230.  The numbering is arbitrary, except that groups with the same crystal system or point group are given consecutive numbers.

 Hall notation
 Space group notation with an explicit origin. Rotation, translation and axis-direction symbols are clearly separated and inversion centers are explicitly defined. The construction and format of the notation make it particularly suited to computer generation of symmetry information. For example, group number 3 has three Hall symbols: P 2y (P 1 2 1), P 2 (P 1 1 2), P 2x (P 2 1 1).
 Schönflies notation The space groups with given point group are numbered by 1, 2, 3, ... (in the same order as their international number) and this number is added as a superscript to the Schönflies symbol for the point group. For example, groups numbers 3 to 5 whose point group is C2 have Schönflies symbols C, C, C.

 Coxeter notation Spatial and point symmetry groups, represented as modifications of the pure reflectional Coxeter groups.
 Geometric notation
 A geometric algebra notation.

Classification systems
There are (at least) 10 different ways to classify space groups into classes. The relations between some of these are described in the following table. Each classification system is a refinement of the ones below it. To understand an explanation given here it may be necessary to understand the next one down.

 gave another classification of the space groups, called a fibrifold notation, according to the fibrifold structures on the corresponding orbifold. They divided the 219 affine space groups into reducible and irreducible groups. The reducible groups fall into 17 classes corresponding to the 17 wallpaper groups, and the remaining 35 irreducible groups are the same as the cubic groups and are classified separately.

In other dimensions

Bieberbach's theorems
In n dimensions, an affine space group, or Bieberbach group, is a discrete subgroup of isometries of n-dimensional Euclidean space with a compact fundamental domain.  proved that the subgroup of translations of any such group contains n linearly independent translations, and is a free abelian subgroup of finite index, and is also the unique maximal normal abelian subgroup. He also showed that in any dimension n there are only a finite number of possibilities for the isomorphism class of the underlying group of a space group, and moreover the action of the group on Euclidean space is unique up to conjugation by affine transformations. This answers part of Hilbert's eighteenth problem.  showed that conversely any group that is the extension of Zn by a finite group acting faithfully is an affine space group. Combining these results shows that classifying space groups in n dimensions up to conjugation by affine transformations is essentially the same as classifying isomorphism classes for groups that are extensions of Zn by a finite group acting faithfully.

It is essential in Bieberbach's theorems to assume that the group acts as isometries; the theorems do not generalize to discrete cocompact groups of affine transformations of Euclidean space. A counter-example is given by the 3-dimensional Heisenberg group of the integers acting by translations on the Heisenberg group of the reals, identified with 3-dimensional Euclidean space. This is a discrete cocompact group of affine transformations of space, but does not contain a subgroup Z3.

Classification in small dimensions
This table gives the number of space group types in small dimensions, including the numbers of various classes of space group. The numbers of enantiomorphic pairs are given in parentheses.

Magnetic groups and time reversal

In addition to crystallographic space groups there are also magnetic space groups (also called two-color (black and white) crystallographic groups or Shubnikov groups). These symmetries contain an element known as time reversal. They treat time as an additional dimension, and the group elements can include time reversal as reflection in it. They are of importance in magnetic structures that contain ordered unpaired spins, i.e. ferro-, ferri- or antiferromagnetic structures as studied by neutron diffraction. The time reversal element flips a magnetic spin while leaving all other structure the same and it can be combined with a number of other symmetry elements. Including time reversal there are 1651 magnetic space groups in 3D . It has also been possible to construct magnetic versions for other overall and lattice dimensions (Daniel Litvin's papers). Frieze groups are magnetic 1D line groups and layer groups are magnetic wallpaper groups, and the axial 3D point groups are magnetic 2D point groups. Number of original and magnetic groups by (overall, lattice) dimension:

Table of space groups in 2 dimensions (wallpaper groups)

Table of the wallpaper groups using the classification of the 2-dimensional space groups:

For each geometric class, the possible arithmetic classes are
 None: no reflection lines
 Along: reflection lines along lattice directions
 Between: reflection lines halfway in between lattice directions
 Both: reflection lines both along and between lattice directions

Table of space groups in 3 dimensions

Note: An e plane is a double glide plane, one having glides in two different directions. They are found in seven orthorhombic, five tetragonal and five cubic space groups, all with centered lattice.

The lattice system can be found as follows. If the crystal system is not trigonal then the lattice system is of the same type. If the crystal system is trigonal, then the lattice system is hexagonal unless the space group is one of the seven in the rhombohedral lattice system consisting of the 7 trigonal space groups in the table above whose name begins with R. (The term rhombohedral system is also sometimes used as an alternative name for the whole trigonal system.) The hexagonal lattice system is larger than the hexagonal crystal system, and consists of the hexagonal crystal system together with the 18 groups of the trigonal crystal system other than the seven whose names begin with R.

The Bravais lattice of the space group is determined by the lattice system together with the initial letter of its name, which for the non-rhombohedral groups is P, I, F, A or C, standing for the principal, body centered, face centered, A-face centered or C-face centered lattices. There are seven rhombohedral space groups, with initial letter R.

Derivation of the crystal class from the space group 
 Leave out the Bravais type
 Convert all symmetry elements with translational components into their respective symmetry elements without translation symmetry (Glide planes are converted into simple mirror planes; Screw axes are converted into simple axes of rotation)
 Axes of rotation, rotoinversion axes and mirror planes remain unchanged.

References

 English translation:

External links

 International Union of Crystallography
 Point Groups and Bravais Lattices 
  Bilbao Crystallographic Server
 Space Group Info (old) 
 Space Group Info (new) 
 Crystal Lattice Structures: Index by Space Group
 Full list of 230 crystallographic space groups
 Interactive 3D visualization of all 230 crystallographic space groups
 
 The Geometry Center: 2.1 Formulas for Symmetries in Cartesian Coordinates (two dimensions)
 The Geometry Center: 10.1 Formulas for Symmetries in Cartesian Coordinates (three dimensions)

Symmetry
Crystallography
Finite groups
Discrete groups